Gavin Griffin (born 17 September 1993) is a Scottish footballer who plays as a defender.

Career

Partick Thistle
Griffin joined Scottish First Division side Partick Thistle in June 2011 joining up with their under 19 squad after being released by Motherwell. He made his first team debut as a substitute against Livingston on 11 February 2012. In all he made two appearances for the club, and was released at the end of the season.

Airdrie
On 20 July 2012, Griffin joined  Scottish First Division newcomers Airdrie United. He left the club in May 2013.
After that he altered careers to become a lackie in a biscuit factory

Career statistics

References

1993 births
Living people
Footballers from Bellshill
Scottish footballers
Association football defenders
Motherwell F.C. players
Partick Thistle F.C. players
Airdrieonians F.C. players
Scottish Football League players